The Pelican was one of six 40-gun fourth-rate frigates, built for the Commonwealth of England under the 1650 Programme. After commissioning she partook in the First Anglo-Dutch War being present at the Battles of Kentish Knock, Portland, the Gabbard and Scheveningen. She was accidentally burnt at Portsmouth in early 1656.

Pelican was the fourth named vessel since it was used for an 18-gun ship (privateer), with Drake in 1577, renamed Golden Hind in September 1578, mentioned in 1662 (doubtful if ever in the Navy Royal.

Construction and specifications
She was one of six frigates ordered in December 1649. She would be built under contract by John Taylor of Wapping at a contract price of £6.10.0d per ton. She was launched in 1650. Her tonnage was  tons.

Her gun armament in 1653 was 42 guns. This armament consisted of culverins on the lower deck (LD), demi-culverines on the upper deck and sakers on the quarterdeck (QD). Her manning was 180 personnel in 1653.

She was complete at an initial cost of £3,250.

Commissioned service

Service in the Commonwealth Navy
She was commissioned in 1650 under the command of Captain Joseph Jordan for service in Scottish Waters until November when she joined William Penn's Squadron. In 1651 she was with Penn's Squadron in the Mediterranean.

First Anglo-Dutch War
She was at Ayscue's action on 16 August 1652. She then partook in the Battle of Kentish Knock on 28 September 1652. In 1653 she came under command of Captain John Stoakes. She was with Robert Blake's Fleet at the Battle of Portland on 18 February 1653. After the battle she was temporarily under the Command of Captain John Simmonds until Captain Peter Mootham took command. She participated in the Battle of the Gabbard as a member of Red Squadron, Center Division on 2-3 June 1653. She was a member of Red Squadron, Van Division at the Battle of Scheveningen off Texel on 31 July 1653. Later in 1653 she came under command of Captain William Whitehorse to spend the winter of 1653/54 at St Helens.

In 1655 she came under the command of Captain Robert Storey.

Loss
While anchored at Portsmouth she was accidentally burned on 13 February 1656.

Notes

Citations

References

 Lavery, Brian (2003) The Ship of the Line - Volume 1: The development of the battlefleet 1650-1850. Conway Maritime Press. .
 British Warships in the Age of Sail (1603 – 1714), by Rif Winfield, published by Seaforth Publishing, England © Rif Winfield 2009, EPUB ISBN 978-1-78346-924-6
 Fleet Actions, 1.3 Battle of Kentish Knock
 Fleet Actions, 1.5 Battle off Portland (the 'Three Days' Battle')
 Fleet Actions, 1.7 Battle of the Gabbard (North Foreland)
 Fleet Actions, 1.8 Battle of Scheveningen (off Texel)
 Chapter 4, The Fourth Rates - 'Small Ships', Vessels acquired from 24 March 1603, 1650 Programme, Advice
 Colledge, Ships of the Royal Navy, by J.J. Colledge, revised and updated by Lt Cdr Ben Warlow and Steve Bush, published by Seaforth Publishing, Barnsley, Great Britain, © 2020, EPUB , Section P (Pelican)
 The Arming and Fitting of English Ships of War 1600 - 1815, by Brian Lavery, published by US Naval Institute Press © Brian Lavery 1989, Part V Guns, Type of Guns

Ships of the line of the Royal Navy
Ships of the English navy
1650s ships
Ships built in Wapping